Urauchimycins are antimycin antibiotics isolated from marine actinomycete.

References

External links

Antibiotics